Ahmad Taghavi (born January 27, 1978) is a former Iranian footballer, who latterly was signed to the Azadegan League side Pas Hamedan.

Professional
Taghavi joined Saba Qom F.C. in 2009 after spending the previous season at Rah Ahan F.C.

Club career statistics
Last Update  19 October 2010 

 Assist goals

References

Iranian footballers
Persian Gulf Pro League players
Saba players
Rah Ahan players
1978 births
Living people
Association football midfielders